The 12″ Collection is a compilation album by British rock band Queen. It features various 12-inch single format recordings and remixes. "Bohemian Rhapsody" was never released on a 12-inch single and the sleeve notes state that it is included due to its length.

"The Show Must Go On" did appear on a 12-inch single, but not as an extended version.  The sleeve notes do not mention why it was included.

Track listing

References 

 

Queen (band) compilation albums
1992 compilation albums